Khvorshid or Khowrshid, sometimes rendered as Khorshid, may refer to:
 Khowrshid, Khuzestan
 Khvorshid, Mazandaran